Jonathan Adams Jr. (born January 21, 1999) is an American football wide receiver for the New Orleans Breakers of the United States Football League (USFL). He played college football at Arkansas State.

High school
Adams was a four-year letterer and starter at Jonesboro High School in Jonesboro, Arkansas. In his final two years alone, Adams caught 139 passes for 2,633 yards and 45 touchdowns. He was named Arkansas 6A Player of the Year as a senior. A two-star recruit, Adams was lightly recruited and accepted a scholarship offer from his hometown college of Arkansas State University, over offers from Air Force, Central Arkansas, and Missouri State, and walk-on offers from Arkansas and Arkansas-Pine Bluff. He also earned all-state honors in basketball.

College career
Arriving at Arkansas State, Adams appeared in nearly every game as a freshman and sophomore but was primarily a backup, catching 25 passes for 344 yards for four touchdowns across his first two seasons. Adams missed most of his junior year, playing in four games and starting in one, catching 77 yards and a touchdown on the season.

As a senior, Adams caught 75 passes for 1,111 yards and 15 touchdowns. In the season's second game, Adams helped upset the favored Kansas State by catching 98 passes and three touchdowns, securing a 35–31 win over the Wildcats. He was named the 247Sports Player Of The Week twice, the 2020 Sun Belt Player of the Year, and a finalist for the Biletnikoff Award. He also played on the Red Wolves basketball team until his senior year.

Professional career

Detroit Lions
After going undrafted, Adams was invited to the Detroit Lions' training camp in April 2021 and was signed to the team on May 1. Despite making an "impressive showing" during summer camps and performing well in the Lions's first preseason game, Adams was cut on August 20. On September 10, 2021, Adams was suspended from the league for six weeks due to an undisclosed violation.

New Orleans Breakers
Adams was drafted the 15th round of the 2022 USFL Draft by the New Orleans Breakers of the United States Football League (USFL). In the 2022 season, Adams caught 31 passes for 406 yards and five touchdowns, finishing fifth in the league for receiving yards for the season.

References

External links
Arkansas State Red Wolves bio

1999 births
Living people
American football wide receivers
Arkansas State Red Wolves football players
Players of American football from Arkansas
Detroit Lions players
New Orleans Breakers (2022) players
People from Jonesboro, Arkansas